Four ships of the Royal Navy have borne the name HMS Larne, after the town of Larne. A fifth was renamed shortly before being launched:

 was a 20-gun sixth rate launched in 1814 and sold in 1828.
 was an  launched in 1910 and sold in 1921.
HMS Larne was to have been a L-class destroyer. She was renamed  shortly before her launch in 1940, and was sunk in 1943.
 was an  launched in 1943. She was sold to the Italian Navy in 1947 and renamed Eritrea, and then Alabarda in 1951. She was broken up in 1981.

Royal Navy ship names